Abdul Raji Sahrin, also known as Hassan Jawali (1950/1951 – January 20, 2021), was a Moro revolutionary and politician. He was a member of the Moro National Liberation Front (MNLF) and the Interim Bangsamoro Parliament. He was also the Deputy Chief Minister of Bangsamoro for the Islands.

Background

Moro National Liberation Front
As a member of the Moro National Liberation Front (MNLF) from Batch 300, he was affiliated with the group's Sema faction. Sahrin was secretary general of the MNLF.

Sahrin, speaking on behalf of the MNLF Senior Leaders' Forum, condemned Nur Misuari and his secessionist bid, following the Zamboanga City crisis of 2013.

Bangsamoro
When the Bangsamoro Basic Law was being drafted, Sahrin was skeptical of the formation of a Moro Islamic Liberation Front-led (MILF) Bangsamoro region. Noting the rivalry of the Tausūgs and Maguindanaons, he said that the former don't want the latter to govern over them expressing preference for the formation of two autonomous regions under a federal government; one in the Sulu archipelago and the other in Central Mindanao.

When the Bangsamoro region was formed in 2019, Sahrin became part of the Bangsamoro Transition Authority. Sahrin was appointed the Deputy Chief Minister of Bangsamoro for the Islands by interim Chief Minister Murad Ebrahim. He served alongside Ali Solaiman, who was appointed deputy for the mainland. The BTA later served as the Interim Bangsamoro Parliament, with Sahrin helping the regional government attend to the affairs of Bangsamoro's island province.

As member of the parliament, he was the principal author of the legislation which formalized the adoption of the Bangsamoro Parliament seal. He co-authored five other bills.

Death
Sahrin died in office on January 20, 2021, at the Zamboanga Peninsula Medical Center due to a brain tumor. He was 70 years old.

References

1950s births
2021 deaths
Filipino Muslims
Tausūg people
Members of the Bangsamoro Transition Authority Parliament
Year of birth missing
Moro National Liberation Front members